In mathematical analysis, a function of bounded variation, also known as  function, is a real-valued function whose total variation is bounded (finite): the graph of a function having this property is well behaved in a precise sense. For a continuous function of a single variable, being of bounded variation means that the distance along the direction of the -axis, neglecting the contribution of motion along -axis, traveled by a point moving along the graph has a finite value. For a continuous function of several variables, the meaning of the definition is the same, except for the fact that the continuous path to be considered cannot be the whole graph of the given function (which is a hypersurface in this case), but can be every intersection of the graph itself with a hyperplane (in the case of functions of two variables, a plane) parallel to a fixed -axis and to the -axis.

Functions of bounded variation are precisely those with respect to which one may find Riemann–Stieltjes integrals of all continuous functions.

In particular, a BV function may have discontinuities, but at most countably many.

One of the most important aspects of functions of bounded variation is that they form an algebra of discontinuous functions whose first derivative exists almost everywhere: due to this fact, they can and frequently are used to define generalized solutions of nonlinear problems involving functionals, ordinary and partial differential equations in mathematics, physics and engineering.

We have the following chains of inclusions for continuous functions over a closed, bounded interval of the real line:

 Continuously differentiable ⊆ Lipschitz continuous ⊆ absolutely continuous ⊆ continuous and bounded variation  ⊆ differentiable almost everywhereHistory
According to Boris Golubov, BV functions of a single variable were first introduced by Camille Jordan, in the paper  dealing with the convergence of Fourier series. The first successful step in the generalization of this concept to functions of several variables was due to Leonida Tonelli, who introduced a class of continuous BV functions in 1926 , to extend his direct method for finding solutions to problems in the calculus of variations in more than one variable. After him, several authors applied BV functions to study Fourier series in several variables, geometric measure theory, calculus of variations, and mathematical physics. Renato Caccioppoli and Ennio de Giorgi used them to define measure of nonsmooth boundaries of sets (see the entry "Caccioppoli set" for further information). Olga Arsenievna Oleinik introduced her view of generalized solutions for nonlinear partial differential equations as functions from the space BV in the paper , and was able to construct a generalized solution of bounded variation of a first order partial differential equation in the paper : few years later, Edward D. Conway and Joel A. Smoller applied BV-functions to the study of a single nonlinear hyperbolic partial differential equation of first order in the paper , proving that the solution of the Cauchy problem for such equations is a function of bounded variation, provided the initial value belongs to the same class. Aizik Isaakovich Vol'pert developed extensively a calculus for BV functions: in the paper  he proved the chain rule for BV functions and in the book  he, jointly with his pupil Sergei Ivanovich Hudjaev, explored extensively the properties of BV functions and their application. His chain rule formula was later extended by Luigi Ambrosio and Gianni Dal Maso in the paper .

Formal definition

 BV functions of one variable 
 The total variation of a continuous real-valued (or more generally complex-valued) function f, defined on an interval [a, b] ⊂ ℝ is the quantity

where the supremum is taken over the set  of all partitions of the interval considered.

If f is differentiable and its derivative is Riemann-integrable, its total variation is the vertical component of the arc-length of its graph, that is to say,

 A continuous real-valued function  on the real line is said to be of bounded variation (BV function) on a chosen interval [a, b] ⊂ ℝ if its total variation is finite, i.e.

It can be proved that a real function ƒ is of bounded variation in  if and only if it can be written as the difference ƒ = ƒ1 − ƒ2 of two non-decreasing functions on : this result is known as the Jordan decomposition of a function and it is related to the Jordan decomposition of a measure.

Through the Stieltjes integral, any function of bounded variation on a closed interval [a, b] defines a bounded linear functional on C([a, b]). In this special case, the Riesz–Markov–Kakutani representation theorem states that every bounded linear functional arises uniquely in this way. The normalized positive functionals or probability measures correspond to positive non-decreasing lower semicontinuous functions. This point of view has been important in
spectral theory, in particular in its application to ordinary differential equations.

BV functions of several variables
Functions of bounded variation, BV functions, are functions whose distributional derivative is a finite Radon measure. More precisely:

if there exists a finite vector Radon measure  such that the following equality holds

BV can be defined equivalently in the following way. 

where  is the essential supremum norm. Sometimes, especially in the theory of Caccioppoli sets, the following notation is used

This notation reminds also that if  is of class   (i.e. a continuous and differentiable function having continuous derivatives) then its variation is exactly the integral of the absolute value of its gradient.

The space of functions of bounded variation (BV functions) can then be defined as

The two definitions are equivalent since if  then

therefore  defines a continuous linear functional on the space . Since  as a linear subspace, this continuous linear functional can be extended continuously and linearly to the whole  by the Hahn–Banach theorem. Hence the continuous linear functional defines a Radon measure by the Riesz–Markov–Kakutani representation theorem.

Locally BV functions

 

Notation
There are basically two distinct conventions for the notation of spaces of functions of locally or globally bounded variation, and unfortunately they are quite similar: the first one, which is the one adopted in this entry, is used for example in references  (partially),  (partially),  and is the following one
 identifies the space of functions of globally bounded variation
 identifies the space of functions of locally bounded variation
 identifies the space of functions of globally bounded variation
 identifies the space of functions of locally bounded variation

Basic properties
Only the properties common to functions of one variable and to functions of several variables will be considered in the following, and proofs will be carried on only for functions of several variables since the proof for the case of one variable is a straightforward adaptation of the several variables case: also, in each section it will be stated if the property is shared also by functions of locally bounded variation or not.

BV functions have only jump-type or removable discontinuities
In the case of one variable, the assertion is clear: for each point  in the interval  of definition of the function , either one of the following two assertions is true

while both limits exist and are finite. In the case of functions of several variables, there are some premises to understand: first of all, there is a continuum of directions along which it is possible to approach a given point  belonging to the domain ⊂. It is necessary to make precise a suitable concept of limit: choosing a unit vector  it is possible to divide  in two sets

Then for each point  belonging to the domain  of the BV function , only one of the following two assertions is true

or  belongs to a subset of  having zero -dimensional Hausdorff measure. The quantities

are called approximate limits of the BV function  at the point .

V(·, Ω) is lower semi-continuous on L1(Ω)
The functional  is lower semi-continuous:
Then, since all the functions of the sequence and their limit function are integrable and by the definition of lower limit

Now considering the supremum on the set of functions  such that  then the following inequality holds true

which is exactly the definition of lower semicontinuity.

BV(Ω) is a Banach space

for all  therefore for all , and

for all , therefore  for all , and all . Consider now the function  defined as

Finally, again by lower semicontinuity, choosing an arbitrary small positive number From this we deduce that  is continuous because it's a norm.

BV(Ω) is not separable
To see this, it is sufficient to consider the following example belonging to the space : for each 0 < α < 1 define

as the characteristic function of the left-closed interval . Then, choosing α,β∈ such that α≠β the following relation holds true:

Now, in order to prove that every dense subset of  cannot be countable, it is sufficient to see that for every  it is possible to construct the balls

This implies that this family has the cardinality of the continuum: now, since every dense subset of  must have at least a point inside each member of this family, its cardinality is at least that of the continuum and therefore cannot a be countable subset.

Chain rule for BV functions
Chain rules for nonsmooth functions are very important in mathematics and mathematical physics since there are several important physical models whose behaviors are described by functions or functionals with a very limited degree of smoothness. The following chain rule is proved in the paper . Note all partial derivatives must be interpreted in a generalized sense, i.e., as generalized derivatives.Theorem.
Then  and

where  is the mean value of the function at the point , defined as

A more general chain rule formula for Lipschitz continuous functions  has been found by Luigi Ambrosio and Gianni Dal Maso and is published in the paper .

This implies that the product of two functions of bounded variation is again a function of bounded variation, therefore  is an algebra.

BV(Ω) is a Banach algebra

Generalizations and extensions

Weighted BV functions 
It is possible to generalize the above notion of total variation so that different variations are weighted differently. More precisely, let  be any increasing function such that  (the weight function) and let  be a function from the interval ⊂ℝ taking values in a normed vector space .

where, as usual, the supremum is taken over all finite partitions of the interval , i.e. all the finite sets of real numbers  such that

The original notion of variation considered above is the special case of -variation for which the weight function is the identity function: therefore an integrable function  is said to be a weighted BV function (of weight ) if and only if its -variation is finite.

The space  is a topological vector space with respect to the norm

Weighted BV functions were introduced and studied in full generality by Władysław Orlicz and Julian Musielak in the paper : Laurence Chisholm Young studied earlier the case  where  is a positive integer.

SBV functions
SBV functions i.e.

Definition. Given a locally integrable function , then  if and only if

1.

2.

where  is the -dimensional Hausdorff measure.

Details on the properties of SBV functions can be found in works cited in the bibliography section: particularly the paper  contains a useful bibliography.

bv sequences
As particular examples of Banach spaces,  consider spaces of sequences of bounded variation, in addition to the spaces of functions of bounded variation. The total variation of a sequence x = (xi) of real or complex numbers is defined by

The space of all sequences of finite total variation is denoted by bv. The norm on bv is given by

The total variation itself defines a norm on a certain subspace of bv, denoted by bv0, consisting of sequences x = (xi) for which

The norm on bv0 is denoted

Measures of bounded variation
A signed (or complex) measure  on a measurable space  is said to be of bounded variation if its total variation  is bounded: see ,  or the entry "Total variation" for further details.

Examples

As mentioned in the introduction, two large class of examples of BV functions are monotone functions, and absolutely continuous functions. For a negative example: the function

is not of bounded variation on the interval 

While it is harder to see, the continuous function

is not of bounded variation on the interval  either.

At the same time, the function

is of bounded variation on the interval .

Cantor function is a well-known example of a function of bounded variation that is not absolutely continuous. 

In fact, for each  in  it is possible to choose a measure  (where  is the Lebesgue measure on ) such that the equality

holds, since it is nothing more than the definition of weak derivative, and hence holds true. One can easily find an example of a BV function which is not :  in dimension one, any step function with a non-trivial jump will do.

Applications

Mathematics 

Functions of bounded variation have been studied in connection with the set of discontinuities of functions and differentiability of real functions, and the following results are well-known. If  is a real function of bounded variation on an interval  then

  is continuous except at most on a countable set;
 the derivative  exists almost everywhere (i.e. except for a set of measure zero).

For real functions of several real variables

 the characteristic function of a Caccioppoli set is a BV function: BV functions lie at the basis of the modern theory of perimeters.
 Minimal surfaces are graphs of BV functions: in this context, see reference .

Physics and engineering
The ability of BV functions to deal with discontinuities has made their use widespread in the applied sciences: solutions of problems in mechanics, physics, chemical kinetics are very often representable by functions of bounded variation. The book  details a very ample set of mathematical physics applications of BV functions. Also there is some modern application which deserves a brief description.

The Mumford–Shah functional: the segmentation problem for a two-dimensional image, i.e. the problem of faithful reproduction of contours and grey scales is equivalent to the minimization of such functional.
Total variation denoising

See also

 Renato Caccioppoli
 Caccioppoli set
 Lamberto Cesari
 Ennio de Giorgi
 Helly's selection theorem
 Locally integrable function
 Lp(Ω) space
 Lebesgue–Stieltjes integral
 Radon measure
 Reduced derivative
 Riemann–Stieltjes integral
 Total variation
 Aizik Isaakovich Vol'pert
 Total variation denoising

Notes

References

Research works
. 

. Includes a discussion of the functional-analytic properties of spaces of functions of bounded variation.
.
,  particularly part I, chapter 1 "Functions of bounded variation and Caccioppoli sets". A good reference on the theory of Caccioppoli sets and their application to the minimal surface problem.
. The link is to a preview of a later reprint by Springer-Verlag.
. The whole book is devoted to the theory of  functions and their applications to problems in mathematical physics involving discontinuous functions and geometric objects with non-smooth boundaries.
. Maybe the most complete book reference for the theory of  functions in one variable: classical results and advanced results are collected in chapter 6 "Bounded variation" along with several exercises. The first author was a collaborator of Lamberto Cesari.
.
. 
. One of the most complete monographs on the theory of Young measures, strongly oriented to applications in continuum mechanics of fluids.
; particularly chapter 6, "On functions in the space ". One of the best monographs on the theory of Sobolev spaces.

. In this paper, Musielak and Orlicz developed the concept of weighted  functions introduced by Laurence Chisholm Young to its full generality.

.

Historical references
.
. In this paper, the authors prove the compactness of the space of SBV functions.
. A paper containing a very general chain rule formula for composition of BV functions.
. The first paper on  functions and related variational problems.
. Available at Numdam. In the paper "On the functions of bounded variation" (English translation of the title) Cesari he extends the now called Tonelli plane variation concept to include in the definition a subclass of the class of integrable functions.
. "The work of Leonida Tonelli and his influence on scientific thinking in this century" (English translation of the title) is an ample commemorative article, reporting recollections of the Author about teachers and colleagues, and a detailed survey of his and theirs scientific work, presented at the International congress in occasion of the celebration of the centenary of birth of Mauro Picone and Leonida Tonelli (held in Rome on May 6–9, 1985).
. An important paper where properties of BV functions were applied to obtain a global in time existence theorem for single hyperbolic equations of first order in any number of variables.
. A survey paper on free-discontinuity variational problems including several details on the theory of SBV functions, their applications and a rich bibliography.
. The first part of a survey of many different definitions of "Total variation" and associated functions of bounded variation.
. The second part of a survey of many different definitions of "Total variation" and associated functions of bounded variation.
 (at Gallica). This is, according to Boris Golubov, the first paper on functions of bounded variation.
. An important paper where the author describes generalized solutions of nonlinear partial differential equations as  functions.
. An important paper where the author constructs a weak solution in BV for a nonlinear partial differential equation with the method of vanishing viscosity.
Tony F. Chan and Jianhong (Jackie) Shen (2005), Image Processing and Analysis - Variational, PDE, Wavelet, and Stochastic Methods, SIAM Publisher,  (with in-depth coverage and extensive applications of Bounded Variations in modern image processing, as started by Rudin, Osher, and Fatemi).

External links

Theory 
 
.

Function of bounded variation at Encyclopedia of Mathematics

Other
 Luigi Ambrosio home page at the Scuola Normale Superiore di Pisa. Academic home page (with preprints and publications) of one of the contributors to the theory and applications of BV functions.
 Research Group in Calculus of Variations and Geometric Measure Theory, Scuola Normale Superiore di Pisa.

Real analysis
Calculus of variations
Measure theory